Men's Super G World Cup 2006/2007

Calendar

Final point standings

In Men's Super G World Cup 2006/07 all results count.

Note:
In the last race only the best racers were allowed to compete and only the best 15 finishers were awarded with points.

Men's Super G Team Results

bold = highest score italics = race wins

World Cup
FIS Alpine Ski World Cup men's Super-G discipline titles